The astrapian sicklebill, also known as the green-breasted riflebird, is a bird in the Paradisaeidae family that is believed to be an intergeneric hybrid between an Arfak astrapia and black sicklebill. This explanation was proposed by Erwin Stresemann who used the same explanation for the Elliot's bird-of-paradise. The two forms are substantially different and the latter's validity is still under question.

History
Only one adult male specimen of this hybrid is known, held by the American Museum of Natural History, and presumably deriving from the Vogelkop Peninsula of north-western New Guinea.

Notes

References
 

Hybrid birds of paradise
Birds of New Guinea
Intergeneric hybrids